Robert Walker Tayler Sr. (November 9, 1812 – February 25, 1878) was a Republican politician in the U.S. State of Ohio who was a member of the Ohio Senate and was Ohio State Auditor 1860–1863.

Robert Tayler was born at Harrisburg, Pennsylvania. He was moved to Youngstown, Ohio as an infant. He studied law, and was admitted to the bar in Trumbull County. In 1839, he was elected Prosecuting Attorney of Trumbull County, serving four years. He then moved back to Youngstown. In 1851, he was elected Mayor of Youngstown.

In 1855 and 1857, Tayler was elected to represent the 23rd district in the Ohio Senate for the 52nd and 53rd General Assemblies (1856–1859). In 1859, he defeated Democrat Godwin Volney Dorsey for Ohio State Auditor, taking office in 1860. He resigned when, in 1863, he was appointed First Comptroller of the United States Treasury by President Lincoln. He held that office 15 years, and was known as the "watch-dog of the Treasury". He died in Washington in 1878.

Tayler's first wife was Louisa Woodbridge, sister of Timothy, and they had seven children, including Robert Walker Tayler, a federal judge and Congressman. Tayler's second wife was Rachel Kirtland Wick, daughter of Caleb Wick. They had seven children, including Wick Tayler of the Ohio House of Representatives.

Notes

References

Ohio lawyers
Mayors of Youngstown, Ohio
1812 births
1878 deaths
State Auditors of Ohio
Republican Party Ohio state senators
Comptrollers of the United States Treasury
County district attorneys in Ohio
Presidents of the Ohio State Senate
19th-century American politicians
Lawyers from Youngstown, Ohio
19th-century American lawyers
19th-century American businesspeople